The Book of Snobs is a collection of satirical works by William Makepeace Thackeray published in book form in 1848, the same year as his more famous Vanity Fair. The pieces first appeared in fifty-three weekly pieces from February 28, 1846 to February 27, 1847, as "The Snobs of England, by one of themselves", in the satirical magazine Punch. The pieces, which were immensely popular and thrust Thackeray into widespread public view, were "rigorously revised" before their collection in book form and omitted the numbers which dealt with then current political issues (numbers 17–23).

References

External links
 
 The Book of Snobs at the Internet Archive
 

Novels by William Makepeace Thackeray
1848 British novels
Novels first published in serial form
Victorian novels
Works originally published in Punch (magazine)